The Hudspith Steam Bicycle is a fully functioning, steam-powered bicycle, designed and made by Geoff Hudspith.

It first ran in October 2000 and was first exhibited publicly at the 2001 Great Dorset Steam Fair. It has since been exhibited - and ridden - at other rallies, including those in Denmark France and Germany.

Hudspith has also built a steam-powered gramophone.

References

External links 

 
 

Motorized bicycles